State Route 579 (SR 579) is a state highway in Clark County, Nevada. It follows a portion of Bonanza Road near the downtown area of Las Vegas. The route encompasses a small portion of former State Route 5 and the entirety of former State Route 5A, and also carried U.S. Route 95 (US 95) before it was relocated to its present freeway alignment.

Route description

State Route 579 begins at the junction of Bonanza Road and Rancho Drive (SR 599, US 95 Business). From there, the highway heads east along Bonanza Road, traveling past various business including the offices of the Las Vegas Review-Journal newspaper. SR 579 passes underneath Interstate 15, U.S. Route 93 and the Union Pacific Railroad tracks (at the Clark Avenue Railroad Underpass) as it parallels Interstate 515, U.S. Route 93 and U.S. Route 95. The road then curves slightly southeast, aligning with the downtown street grid as it intersects Main Street. Bonanza Road then passes by various City of Las Vegas buildings, including the municipal pool and Las Vegas Fire & Rescue headquarters. State Route 579 ends at the intersection of Bonanza Road and Las Vegas Boulevard (former SR 604).

History

State Route 5, established by 1929, was a major Nevada route connecting south-central Nevada near Goldfield to the southern tip of the state via Las Vegas.

When US 95 was extended through Nevada in 1940, it was routed along many existing highways in Nevada, the longest of those routes being State Route 5. Thus, US 95 followed the Bonanza Road segment of SR 5 segment beginning in 1940. By 1968, the Las Vegas Expressway, a new facility designed to move traffic west of downtown, was beginning to take shape. By 1982 at the latest, US 95 was removed completely from Bonanza Road/SR 5 and onto the new expressway.

SR 5 and SR 5A were affected by the renumbering of Nevada's state highways that began on July 1, 1976. At that time, those two designations were removed from the state highway system. In the process, State Route 579 was established along the portions of Bonanza Road previously covered by the old highway routes.

Major intersections

Public transport
RTC Transit Routes 214 & 215 function on this road.

References

579
Streets in Las Vegas
U.S. Route 95